Fredrik Oscar Olle Uddenäs (born 17 August 2002) is a Swedish professional footballer who plays as a winger for Häcken.

Career
Uddenäs is a product of the youth academy of GIF Nike, and moved to Malmö FF from the age of 8 to the U19s. In the summer of 2019, he moved to the youth side of the Italian club S.P.A.L.

After a year as a youth professional in Italy, Uddenäs returned to Sweden signing with Värnamo. He helped Värnamo win the 2020 Ettan, earning promotion into the Superettan. In his sophomore year, Uddenäs worked his way into a starting spot in the squad and had a breakthrough season scoring 6 goals and helping the team win the 2021 Superettan and again earning promotion. He was named the "Superettan's Best Young Player" to finish the season.

On 6 December 2021, Uddenäs transferred to Häcken in the Allsvenskan, signing a 4-year contract.

International career
Uddenäs is a youth international, having represented the U17s and U19s. He was part of Sweden U17s squad at the 2019 UEFA European Under-17 Championship.

Honours
Värnamo

 Superettan: 2021
Ettan: 2020
BK Häcken

 Allsvenskan: 2022

References

External links
 
 SvenskFotboll profile

2002 births
Living people
People from Lomma Municipality
Swedish footballers
Sweden youth international footballers
Association football wingers
IFK Värnamo players
BK Häcken players
Allsvenskan players
Superettan players
Ettan Fotboll players
Swedish expatriate footballers
Swedish expatriate sportspeople in Italy
Expatriate footballers in Italy